Mila Vilotijević (born 1956) is a Serbian soprano. She was born in Belgrade and graduated from the Academy of Music of the University of Belgrade with Irina Ariskin. In 1989 she was awarded her diploma from the "Luigi Cherubini" Florence Conservatory, Florence Italy with Renata Ongaro and Liliana Poli. During her career she was mentored by Elly Ameling, Julia Hamari, Galina Vishnevskaya, Sena Jurinac, Lora Fisher, Irwin Gagge, and Giorgio Favaretto. She performs a vast repertory of music: opera, oratorio and lieder from the Baroque to the present As active solo singer, she participated in the most important music festivals in Europe including Florence (La Damnation de Faust under Myung-Whun Chung and Der Freischütz under Wolfgang Sawallisch) and Salzburg (Tchaikovsky's Yolanta with Galina Vishnevskaya at the Mozarteum). From 1998 she is a "soprano I del Teatro alla Scala di Milano".

See also
Vilotijević

References

External links
discogs.com - Mila Vilotijević discography
Mozart Mass, K427 by Richard Wigmore
Serbian Opera Singer performs in Tokyo
Mila Vilotijevic: A. Scarlatti Si suoni la tromba

Living people
20th-century Serbian women opera singers
Serbian operatic sopranos
Singers from Belgrade
University of Arts in Belgrade alumni
1953 births
21st-century Serbian women opera singers